Ahmed Al-Shamrani (born 24 April 1994) is a Saudi Arabian professional footballer who plays as a defender for Hajer.

Club career
On 30 July 2017, Al-Shamrani signed for Al-Wehda. He helped the club achieve promotion to the Saudi Professional League in his first season.

On 3 September 2021, Al-Shamrani joined Al-Ain.

On 16 August 2022, Al-Shamrani joined Hajer.

Honours
Al-Wehda
MS League: 2017–18

Al-Hazem
MS League: 2020–21

References

External links
 

Living people
1994 births
Saudi Arabian footballers
Association football defenders
Al Batin FC players
Ittihad FC players
Al-Wehda Club (Mecca) players
Al-Hazem F.C. players
Al-Ain FC (Saudi Arabia) players
Hajer FC players
Saudi First Division League players
Saudi Professional League players
People from Al-Hasa